Pleroma is a genus of flowering plant in the family Melastomataceae, native from Puerto Rico and the Leeward Islands to tropical South America (Bolivia, Brazil, Colombia, Ecuador, French Guiana, Peru and Venezuela).

Description
Species of Pleroma are subshrubs, shrubs or trees. Their leaves are almost always opposite and petiolate, rarely sessile. The inflorescence is a terminal panicle or some modification of one. The flowers are perigynous with a bell- or urn-shaped hypanthium (base of the flower), usually externally covered with short, soft hairs (pubescent). There are usually five petals (sometimes four), purple to lilac, rarely white. The flowers have ten stamens (sometimes eight), often of two distinct sizes, with purple or pink anthers. The connective at the base of an anther is modified into a ventral bilobed appendage. The numerous seeds are contained in a dry semiwoody capsule and are spiral in shape, possibly elongated.

Taxonomy
The genus Pleroma was established by David Don in 1823. Although Don used the genus name as a feminine noun, giving specific epithets feminine endings, the Greek word is neuter, and subsequent authors have used neuter endings (e.g. Pleroma heteromallum rather than Don's Pleroma heteromalla).

In 1885, in his treatment for Flora brasiliensis, Alfred Cogniaux used a broad concept of the genus Tibouchina, transferring into it species at that time placed in Pleroma and other genera. This broad concept was generally adopted subsequently, and around 470 taxa were at one time or another assigned to Tibouchina. A phylogenetic analysis in 2013 based on molecular data (2 plastid and 1 nuclear regions) determined that the broad circumscription of Tibouchina was paraphyletic. Four major clades were resolved within the genus which were supported by morphological, molecular and geographic evidence. A further molecular phylogenetic study in 2019 used the same molecular markers but included more species. It reached the same conclusion: the original broadly circumscribed Tibouchina consisted of four monophyletic clades. The authors proposed a split into four genera: a more narrowly circumscribed Tibouchina, two re-established genera Pleroma and Chaetogastra, and a new genus, Andesanthus. The part of their maximum likelihood cladogram which includes former Tibouchina species is as follows, using their genus names and with shading added to show the original broadly circumscribed Tibouchina s.l. (The relationship between Chaetogastra and the genus Brachyotum differed between analyses.)

Pleroma is shown to be sister to Tibouchina.

Species
, Plants of the World Online accepted the following species:

Pleroma ackermannii (Cogn.) P.J.F.Guim. & Michelang.
Pleroma ademarii (P.J.F.Guim., R.Romero & Leoni) P.J.F.Guim. & Michelang.
Pleroma aemula (Cogn.) P.J.F.Guim., A.L.F.Oliveira & R.Romero
Pleroma alatum (Cogn.) P.J.F.Guim. & Michelang.
Pleroma amoenum (Herzog) P.J.F.Guim. & Michelang.
Pleroma andersregnellii P.J.F.Guim. & Michelang.
Pleroma angustifolium (Naudin) Triana
Pleroma apparicioi (Brade) P.J.F.Guim. & Michelang.
Pleroma arboreum Gardner
Pleroma arenarium (Cogn.) P.J.F.Guim. & Michelang.
Pleroma asperius (Cham.) Triana
Pleroma australe Triana
Pleroma axillare (Cogn.) P.J.F.Guim. & Michelang.
Pleroma bahiense (Wurdack) P.J.F.Guim. & Michelang.
Pleroma bandeirae P.J.F.Guim. & Michelang.
Pleroma barnebyanum (Wurdack) P.J.F.Guim. & Michelang.
Pleroma benthamianum Gardner
Pleroma bergianum (Cogn.) P.J.F.Guim. & Michelang.
Pleroma blanchetianum (Cogn.) P.J.F.Guim. & Michelang.
Pleroma boraceiense (Brade) P.J.F.Guim. & Justino
Pleroma boudetii (P.J.F.Guim. & R.Goldenb.) P.J.F.Guim. & Michelang.
Pleroma bracteolatum (J.G.Freitas, A.K.A.Santos & R.P.Oliveira) P.J.F.Guim. & Michelang.
Pleroma caissara F.S.Mey.
Pleroma candolleanum (DC.) Triana
Pleroma canescens (D.Don) P.J.F.Guim. & Michelang.
Pleroma carajasense K.Rocha, R.Goldenb. & F.S.Mey.
Pleroma cardinale (Bonpl.) Triana
Pleroma carvalhoi (Wurdack) P.J.F.Guim. & Michelang.
Pleroma castellense (Brade) P.J.F.Guim. & Michelang.
Pleroma cecilianum P.J.F.Guim. & M.F.Oliveira da Silva
Pleroma cinereum (Cogn.) P.J.F.Guim. & Michelang.
Pleroma claussenii (Naudin) Triana
Pleroma clavatum (Pers.) P.J.F.Guim. & Michelang.
Pleroma cleistoflora (Ule) P.J.F.Guim., M.F.Oliveira da Silva & Michelang.
Pleroma clidemioides O.Berg ex Triana
Pleroma collinum (Naudin) Triana
Pleroma comosum (J.G.Freitas, A.K.A.Santos & R.P.Oliveira) P.J.F.Guim. & Michelang.
Pleroma cordifolium (Cogn.) P.J.F.Guim. & Michelang.
Pleroma costatocalyx F.S.Mey., L.Kollmann & R.Goldenb.
Pleroma crassirame (Cogn.) P.J.F.Guim. & Michelang.
Pleroma cristatum (Brade) P.J.F.Guim. & Michelang.
Pleroma cryptadenum (Gleason) P.J.F.Guim. & Michelang.
Pleroma cucullatum F.S.Mey., Fraga & R.Goldenb.
Pleroma decemcostatum (Cogn.) P.J.F.Guim. & Michelang.
Pleroma dendroides (Naudin) Triana
Pleroma diffusum DC.
Pleroma discolor (Brade) P.J.F.Guim. & Michelang.
Pleroma divaricatum (Cogn.) P.J.F.Guim. & Michelang.
Pleroma dubium (Cham.) P.J.F.Guim. & Michelang.
Pleroma dusenii (Cogn.) P.J.F.Guim. & Michelang.
Pleroma echinatum Gardner
Pleroma edmundoi (Brade & Markgr.) P.J.F.Guim. & Michelang.
Pleroma eichleri (Cogn.) P.J.F.Guim. & Michelang.
Pleroma elegans Gardner
Pleroma estrellense (Raddi) P.J.F.Guim. & Michelang.
Pleroma ferricola A.L.F.Oliveira, R.Romero & P.J.F.Guim.
Pleroma fissinervium (DC.) Gardner
Pleroma floribundum (Cogn.) P.J.F.Guim. & Michelang.
Pleroma fontanae F.S.Mey., L.Kollmann & R.Goldenb.
Pleroma formosum (Cogn.) P.J.F.Guim. & Michelang.
Pleroma fornograndense F.S.Mey., R.Goldenb. & L.Kollmann
Pleroma fothergillae (DC.) Triana
Pleroma foveolatum (Naudin) Triana
Pleroma fragae L.Kollmann & R.Goldenb.
Pleroma francavillanum (Cogn.) P.J.F.Guim. & Michelang.
Pleroma gardneri (Naudin) P.J.F.Guim. & Michelang.
Pleroma gaudichaudianum (DC.) A.Gray
Pleroma gertii P.J.F.Guim. & Michelang.
Pleroma glandulosum (Bonpl.) Triana
Pleroma glutinosum (Markgr.) P.J.F.Guim. & Michelang.
Pleroma goldenbergii (F.S.Mey., P.J.F.Guim. & Kozera) P.J.F.Guim. & Michelang.
Pleroma granulosum (Desr.) D.Don
Pleroma guartelaensis F.S.Mey. & R.Goldenb.
Pleroma hatschbachii (Wurdack) P.J.F.Guim. & Michelang.
Pleroma heteromallum (D.Don) D.Don
Pleroma hirsutissimum (Cogn.) P.J.F.Guim. & Michelang.
Pleroma hospitum (DC.) Triana
Pleroma integerrimum (R.Romero & A.B.Martins) P.J.F.Guim. & Michelang.
Pleroma itatiaiae (Wawra) P.J.F.Guim. & Michelang.
Pleroma kleinii (Wurdack) P.J.F.Guim. & Michelang.
Pleroma kollmanniana F.S.Mey. & R.Goldenb.
Pleroma kuhlmannii (Brade) P.J.F.Guim. & Michelang.
Pleroma laevicaule (Wurdack) P.J.F.Guim. & Michelang.
Pleroma langsdorffianum (Bonpl.) Triana
Pleroma leopoldinense L.Kollmann & R.Goldenb.
Pleroma lhotskyanum (C.Presl) Triana
Pleroma lilacinum (Cogn.) P.J.F.Guim. & Michelang.
Pleroma luetzelburgii (Markgr.) P.J.F.Guim. & Michelang.
Pleroma lutzii (Brade) P.J.F.Guim. & Michelang.
Pleroma macrochiton (DC.) Triana
Pleroma manicatum (Cogn.) P.J.F.Guim. & Michelang.
Pleroma marinanum P.J.F.Guim. & Fraga
Pleroma martiale (Cham.) Triana
Pleroma martiusianum (DC.) P.J.F.Guim. & Michelang.
Pleroma marumbiense (Wurdack) P.J.F.Guim. & Michelang.
Pleroma maximilianum Triana
Pleroma melanocalyx (R.Romero, P.J.F.Guim. & Leoni) P.J.F.Guim. & Michelang.
Pleroma mello-barretoi (Brade) P.J.F.Guim. & Michelang.
Pleroma michelangelii P.J.F.Guim. & J.G.Freitas
Pleroma microphyllum (Cogn.) P.J.F.Guim. & Michelang.
Pleroma minus (R.Romero & A.B.Martins) P.J.F.Guim. & Michelang.
Pleroma minutiflorum (Cogn.) P.J.F.Guim. & Michelang.
Pleroma mirabile (Brade & Markgr.) P.J.F.Guim. & Michelang.
Pleroma molle (Cham.) Triana
Pleroma mosenii (Cogn.) P.J.F.Guim. & Michelang.
Pleroma mourae (Cogn.) P.J.F.Guim. & Michelang.
Pleroma mutabile (Vell.) Triana
Pleroma noblickii (Wurdack) P.J.F.Guim. & Michelang.
Pleroma nodosum (Wurdack) P.J.F.Guim. & Michelang.
Pleroma obscurum Triana
Pleroma ochypetalum (Ruiz & Pav.) D.Don
Pleroma oleifolium (DC.) R.Romero & Versiane
Pleroma oreophilum (Wurdack) P.J.F.Guim. & Michelang.
Pleroma ornatum (Sw.) Triana
Pleroma pallidum (Cogn.) P.J.F.Guim. & Michelang.
Pleroma pauloalvinii (Vinha) P.J.F.Guim. & Michelang.
Pleroma penduliflorum Fraga & P.J.F.Guim.
Pleroma pereirae (Brade & Markgr.) P.J.F.Guim. & Michelang.
Pleroma petiolatum (R.Romero & A.B.Martins) P.J.F.Guim. & Michelang.
Pleroma pilosum (Cogn.) P.J.F.Guim. & Michelang.
Pleroma quartzophilum (Brade) P.J.F.Guim. & Michelang.
Pleroma raddianum (DC.) Gardner
Pleroma radula (Markgr.) P.J.F.Guim. & Michelang.
Pleroma ramboi (Brade) P.J.F.Guim. & Michelang.
Pleroma redivivum O.Berg ex Triana
Pleroma regelianum (Cogn.) P.J.F.Guim. & Michelang.
Pleroma reitzii (Brade) P.J.F.Guim. & Michelang.
Pleroma riedelianum (Cogn.) P.J.F.Guim. & Michelang.
Pleroma rigidulum (Naudin) P.J.F.Guim. & Michelang.
Pleroma riparium (Markgr.) P.J.F.Guim. & Michelang.
Pleroma robustum (Cogn.) P.J.F.Guim. & Michelang.
Pleroma rubrobracteatum (R.Romero & P.J.F.Guim.) P.J.F.Guim. & Michelang.
Pleroma rubrum J.G.Freitas
Pleroma rupicola (Hoehne) P.J.F.Guim. & Michelang.
Pleroma salviifolium (Cham.) Triana
Pleroma scaberrimum Triana
Pleroma schenckii (Cogn.) P.J.F.Guim. & Michelang.
Pleroma schwackei (Cogn.) P.J.F.Guim. & Michelang.
Pleroma sellowianum (Cham.) P.J.F.Guim. & Michelang.
Pleroma semidecandrum (Schrank & Mart. ex DC.) Triana
Pleroma setosociliatum (Cogn.) F.S.Mey. & F.B.Matos
Pleroma stellipile (Wurdack) P.J.F.Guim. & Michelang.
Pleroma stenocarpum (DC.) Triana
Pleroma stipulaceum (Vinha) P.J.F.Guim. & Michelang.
Pleroma subglabrum (Wurdack) P.J.F.Guim. & Michelang.
Pleroma subsessilis F.S.Mey. & L.Kollmann
Pleroma taperoense (Wurdack) P.J.F.Guim. & Michelang.
Pleroma tedescoi (Meirelles, L.Kollmann & R.Goldenb.) P.J.F.Guim. & Michelang.
Pleroma thereminianum (DC.) Triana
Pleroma tomentulosum (Wurdack) P.J.F.Guim. & Michelang.
Pleroma trichopodum DC.
Pleroma trinervium P.J.F.Guim.
Pleroma tuberosum Gardner ex Triana
Pleroma urceolare (DC.) Triana
Pleroma ursinum (Cham.) Triana
Pleroma urvilleanum (DC.) P.J.F.Guim. & Michelang.
Pleroma velutinum (Naudin) Triana
Pleroma venetiense F.S.Mey., L.Kollmann & R.Goldenb.
Pleroma villosissimum Triana
Pleroma vimineum (D.Don) D.Don
Pleroma virgatum Gardner
Pleroma wurdackianum (R.Romero & A.B.Martins) P.J.F.Guim. & Michelang.

Distribution and habitat
Pleroma species are mostly native to eastern Brazil in the Atlantic Forest and Cerrado biomes, more rarely in the Caatinga. A few species reach other parts of South America and the Caribbean (Bolivia, Colombia, Ecuador, French Guiana, the Leeward Islands, Peru, Puerto Rico and Venezuela). They are found in forests and forest margins, river banks, high altitude grasslands, rocky outcrops and restingas, from sea level up to an elevation of 2,650 m.

References

 
Melastomataceae genera